Shing Mun is an area between Tsuen Wan and Sha Tin in the New Territories of Hong Kong. It used to be, as suggested by its Chinese characters, a gate between the two areas separated by a range of hills.

History
Before the construction of Shing Mun Reservoir, there were several villages near the valley. Some of these villages were later relocated near the Tsuen Wan entrance of Shing Mun Tunnels.

The area played a major role in the defense against Japanese Invasion of Hong Kong. Gin Drinkers Line is across the area.

Featured named after Shing Mun
Because there were many major constructions and geography features in the area, Shing Mun may mean one of the following by context:
 Shing Mun Country Park, which contains the Shing Mun Reservoir
 Shing Mun Redoubt, which housed command HQ for the Gin Drinkers Line
 Shing Mun River
 Shing Mun San Tsuen
 Shing Mun Tunnels
 Shing Mun Valley

 
Sha Tin District
Tsuen Wan District